Staring at the Cellophane is the sixth Jandek album, and his third of 1982. It was released as Corwood 0744. It was reissued on CD in 2001.

The cover image appears to be the same picture taken for his previous album, Living in a Moon So Blue, only from a different angle.

This album finds the artist using the technique of repeated lyrics more frequently than before, with songs like "Sand I" ("You're stuck in the sand/Go home"), "I See Lights" ("I see red lights/I see green lights"), and "Michael", whose lyrics "Michael, Michael, where are you now" would be copped by the band Red House Painters ten years later in their song of the same name.

Track listing

External links
Seth Tisue's Staring at the Cellophane review

1982 albums
Corwood Industries albums
Jandek albums